"Way Down We Go" is a song by Icelandic rock band Kaleo, released as the second single for their first studio album A/B by Elektra Records and Atlantic Records.

Commercial performance 
"Way Down We Go" peaked at No. 1 on Billboard's Alternative Songs and Rock Airplay charts.

Live performances
A live performance of the song was recorded in the magma chamber of the dormant Icelandic volcano Thrihnukagigur.

Charts

Weekly charts

Year-end charts

Certifications

Release history

Appearances in other media 
The song was used in the movie Collateral Beauty, in a trailer for the movie Logan, in the trailer for the fourth season of Orange Is the New Black, as well as the shows Suits, Supergirl, Manifest, The Blacklist, Notorious, Lucifer, Grey's Anatomy, Teen Wolf, Blindspot, Eyewitness, This Is Us, Frequency and The Vampire Diaries, an advertisement for Boots UK, Riverdale, NCIS and was featured in the sports video games FIFA 16 and FIFA 23.
A remix of the song was also played by EDM artist Lost Frequencies during his set at Tomorrowland in 2018. It is also available as DLC for the game Rocksmith 2014.

References 

2016 singles
2016 songs
Atlantic Records singles
Number-one singles in Greece
Number-one singles in Russia
Elektra Records singles
Kaleo (band) songs